Macroptilium is a genus of flowering plants in the legume family, Fabaceae. It belongs to the subfamily Faboideae.

Species
Macroptilium is made up of 19 species segregated into two monophyletic sections.

Section Macroptilium
Macroptilium atropurpureum
Macroptilium bracteatum
Macroptilium erythroloma
Macroptilium ecuadoriensis
Macroptilium gracile
Macroptilium lathyroides
Macroptilium longepedunculatum
Macroptilium monophyllum
Macroptilium panduratum

Section Microcochle
Macroptilium arenarium
Macroptilium cochleatum
Macroptilium fraternum
Macroptilium gibbosifolium (Ortega) A. Delgado
Macroptilium martii
Macroptilium pedatum
Macroptilium prostratum
Macroptilium psammodes
Macroptilium sabaraense
Macroptilium supinum

References

External links
USDA Plants Profile

Phaseoleae
Fabaceae genera